The D Train (also known as Bad Bromance) is a 2015 American black comedy film written and directed by Jarrad Paul and Andrew Mogel in their directorial debuts, and stars Jack Black and James Marsden. The film premiered at the 11th Sundance Film Festival on January 23, 2015, and was released in the United States on May 8, 2015 by IFC Films.

Premise
Dan Landsman is the self-proclaimed chairman of his Pittsburgh high school's alumni committee. While planning the twenty-year reunion he has the idea of convincing Oliver Lawless, the most popular guy in his graduating class (and now a TV-commercial celebrity) to return, thinking that this will make people want to attend.

Cast

 Jack Black as Daniel Gregory Landsman (aka The D Train)
 James Marsden as Oliver Lawless
 Kathryn Hahn as Stacey Landsman 
 Jeffrey Tambor as Bill Shurmur
 Russell Posner as Zach Landsman
 Kyle Bornheimer as Randy
 Mike White as Jerry
 Henry Zebrowski as Craig
 Denise Williamson as Alyssa
 Donna Duplantier as Taj
 Han Soto as Dale
 John-Paul Flaim as Radio Host
 Eric Bickel as Radio Host
 John Auville as Radio Host
 Jason Bishop as Radio Host
 Dermot Mulroney as himself

Production
On February 10, 2014, it was announced that Jack Black and James Marsden would star in a comedy film, directing debut of Jarrad Paul and Andrew Mogel, which Black's Electric Dynamite produced with Mike White's RipCord Productions and Ben Latham-Jones and Barnaby Thompson of Ealing Studios.

Filming
According to a casting call, the shooting was set to begin on March 17, 2014, in Metairie, Louisiana. Later on March 19, Black was spotted during the filming of The D Train in New Orleans. Due to Black's schedule, the film was shot in just 21 days.

Music
In October 2014, Andrew Dost was hired to compose the music for the film.

A Pittsburgh sports radio segment playing when Dan arrives at a sports bar includes an audio cameo by John-Paul "JP" Flaim, Eric "EB" Bickel, Johnny "Cakes" Auville and Jason "Lurch" Bishop, the titular hosts of The Sports Junkies in Washington. The Junkies also released audio of them reading their lines in studio.

Release
The D Train was released theatrically in the United States on May 8, 2015, by IFC Films.

Box office
As of November 10, 2015, the film has grossed $771,317.

In its opening weekend, the film grossed $447,524 from 1,009 theaters ($444 per theater), which is the 15th worst opening for a wide release film of all-time. In its second weekend, the film was pulled from 847 screens, and its weekend-to-weekend gross fell 96.5%, as it only earned $15,714 ($97 per theater).

Critical response
On Rotten Tomatoes the film has a rating of 53% based on 134 reviews, with an average rating of 5.70/10. The site's consensus reads, "The D Train offers Jack Black a too-rare opportunity to showcase his range, but its story and characters are too sloppily conceived to hold together as a film." On Metacritic the film has a weighted average score of 55 out of 100, based on 33 critics, indicating "mixed or average reviews".

The New York Post described the film as "cute, breezy fun".

References

External links
 

2015 films
2015 black comedy films
American buddy comedy films
American black comedy films
American LGBT-related films
Films shot in Louisiana
Films shot in New Orleans
Ealing Studios films
Films set in Pittsburgh
Class reunions in popular culture
2015 directorial debut films
2015 independent films
2015 LGBT-related films
2010s English-language films
2010s buddy comedy films
2010s American films